The Retreat at Twin Lakes is a gated community in the US city of Sanford, Florida. It was the site of the killing of Trayvon Martin by George Zimmerman. The community initially consisted of 1,400-square-foot (130 m2) townhouses which sold on average for $250,000, but had values below $100,000 by February 2012 due in large part to the financial crisis of 2007–2008.

History
In 2004, Engle Homes began construction on the 263 two-story townhouse development which is located 18 miles (30 km) northeast of downtown Orlando. The community, near Interstate 4 in a suburban section of Sanford, was marketed as "an oasis where nobody could park a car on the street or paint the house an odd color." The remaining lots were acquired by Lennar following the 2008 bankruptcy filing of Engle, and the neighborhood was finally built out in 2011.

George Zimmerman moved to the community in 2009. At that time, the United States was experiencing the Great Recession. This caused a "demographic transformation" of the gated community, where 1,400-square-foot (130 m2) townhouses had once sold on average for $250,000. However, by February 2012, that value "...had fallen below $100,000."  With the change came a "spate of burglaries"  which were largely due to the "...large-scale foreclosures in the wake of the housing crash led investors to rent, rather than sell, the spaces, which brought a new, transient type of resident."  These events were the background which led to the fatal shooting and the controversy of the stand-your-ground laws which were in effect in the entire state of Florida.  After the shootings, the community was in the "national spotlight."

Demographics
According to the Columbia Journalism Review, The Retreat at Twin Lakes has a demographic that mirrored that of the city it was in, which was "relatively diverse—50 percent white, 30 percent Hispanic, and 20 percent black." In 2010, the community reported 326 crime incidents which ranged from homicide to burglaries. According to another source, the community was one where "very few black teens like [Trayvon Martin] live."

In an opinion piece in The New York Times, Rich Benjamin blames the gated communities for contributing to the death of Trayvon Martin saying "gated communities churn a vicious cycle by attracting like-minded residents who seek shelter from outsiders and whose physical seclusion then worsens paranoid groupthink against outsiders."

References

External links

Gated communities in Florida
Sanford, Florida
Killing of Trayvon Martin
2000s establishments in Florida